A Semi-Closed Game (or Semi-Closed Opening) is a chess opening in which White plays 1.d4 but Black does not make the symmetrical reply 1...d5.  (The openings starting 1.d4 d5 are the Closed Games.)

Important openings

By far the most important category of the semi-closed openings are the Indian systems, which begin 1.d4 Nf6.
As these defenses have much in common and have a great deal more theory than all the remaining semi-closed openings put together, they are treated in a separate article; see Indian defense for details.

The third most common response to 1.d4 (after 1...Nf6 and 1...d5) is 1...e6. 1...e6 rarely has independent significance, usually transposing to another opening, e.g. the Dutch Defense (2.c4 f5 or 2.Nf3 f5), French Defense (2.e4 d5), or Queen's Gambit Declined (2.c4 d5). Another possibility is 2.c4. 2...Bb4+ is the Keres Defence (also known as the Kangaroo Defence), which is fully playable, but also little independent significance, since it often transposes into the Dutch, Nimzo-Indian, or Bogo-Indian. 2...b6 is the English Defense. As well, 1...e6 is sometimes used by players wishing to play the Dutch Defense (1.d4 f5) without allowing White the option of 2.e4!?, the Staunton Gambit. 

Other important responses to 1.d4 include the Dutch (1...f5) and the Benoni Defense (1...c5). The Dutch, an aggressive defense adopted for a time by World Champions Alekhine and Botvinnik, and played by both Botvinnik and challenger David Bronstein in their 1951 world championship match, is still played occasionally at the top level by Short and others. The Benoni Defense is also fairly common, and may become very wild if it develops into the Modern Benoni, though other variations are more solid.

1...d6 is reasonable, and may transpose to the King's Indian Defense (e.g. after 2.Nf3 g6 3.c4 Bg7 4.Nc3 d6), Grünfeld Defence (e.g. after 2.Nf3 g6 3.c4 Bg7 4.Nc3 d5), Old Indian Defense (e.g. after 2.Nf3 Nbd7 3.c4 e5 4.Nc3 Be7), Pirc Defense (2.e4 Nf6 3.Nc3 g6), or even Philidor's Defense (e.g. 2.e4 Nf6 3.Nc3 Nbd7 4.Nf3 e5). The Wade Defence, a slightly offbeat but fully playable line, arises after 1...d6 2.Nf3 Bg4. Note that the plausible 2.c4 e5 3.dxe5?! dxe5 4.Qxd8+ Kxd8 scores less than 50% for White.

Uncommon openings

The remaining semi-closed openings are uncommon. The Polish Defense has never been very popular but has been tried by Spassky, Ljubojević, and Csom, among others. The Queen's Knight Defense is an uncommon opening that often transposes to the Nimzowitsch Defence after 1.d4 Nc6 2.e4 or the Chigorin Defense after 2.c4 d5, although it can lead to unique lines, for example after 1.d4 Nc6 2.d5 or 2.c4 e5. The Englund Gambit is a rare and dubious sacrifice.

List
1.d4 b5 Polish Defense
1.d4 c5 Benoni Defense
1.d4 Nc6 Queen's Knight Defense
1.d4 d6 Wade Defence
1.d4 e5 Englund Gambit
1.d4 e6 2.c4 b6 English Defense
1.d4 e6 2.c4 Bb4+ Keres Defence
1.d4 Nf6 Indian Systems (this is an enormous category, treated separately)
1.d4 f5 Dutch Defense

See also
Open Game (1.e4 e5)
Semi-Open Game (1.e4 other)
Closed Game (1.d4 d5)
Flank opening (1.c4, 1.Nf3, 1.f4, and others)
Irregular chess opening

References

Semi-Closed Game
Chess terminology